Argo is a masculine given name and a surname which may refer to:

 Allison Argo (born 1953), American film producer, director, writer, editor and narrator
 Arthur Argo (1935–1981), Scottish folk musician, playwright and poet
 Bob Argo (born 1923), American politician
 Edwin Argo (1895–1962), American horse rider
 Victor Argo (1934–2004), American actor
 Argo Aadli (born 1980), Estonian actor
 Argo Arbeiter (born 1973), Estonian football manager and former player
 Argo Golberg (born 1982), Estonian runner at the 2003 IAAF World Indoor Championships – Men's 60 metres
 Argo Meresaar (born 1980), Estonian retired volleyball player

Estonian masculine given names